The Syro-Malankara Catholic Eparchy of St. Mary, Queen of Peace, of the United States of America and Canada is the North American eparchy for the Syro-Malankara Catholic Church of the Catholic Church. The Syro-Malankara Church observes the Antiochian Rite in the Syriac language.

It is immediately subject to the Major Archbishop of Trivandrum, and is not part of an ecclesiastical province.
 
Its Cathedral episcopal see is the St. Vincent de Paul Syro Malankara Catholic Cathedral in Elmont, New York.

History 
In 2001, the Holy Synod of the Syro-Malankara Catholic Church requested that Pope John Paul II establish a jurisdiction for Syro-Malankara parishes in the United States, which had each been functioning under the direction of the local Latin Church bishops, and requested the appointment of a proper Ordinary of the church sui iuris.  On July 14, 2010, Pope Benedict XVI erected the Syro-Malankara Catholic Apostolic Exarchate in the United States, a missionary pre-diocesan apostolic exarchate. Thomas Eusebius, formerly secretary general of the Syro-Malankara Catholic Major Archeparchy of Trivandrum, became the first Exarch. In the sole incumbent was also vested the office of Apostolic Visitor in Canada of the Syro-Malankars.

Council 
 President: Philippos Stephanos
 Secretary: Philipose Mathew
 Syncellus: Peter Kochery, Corepiscopa
 Vicar General: Augustine Mangalath
 Leader of Media Relations: Mohan P. Varughese

Episcopal ordinaries
(all of the Syro-Malankara Catholic Church)

Apostolic Exarchs of United States of America
 Thomas Eusebius (July 14, 2010 – January 4, 2016), Titular Bishop of Lares (Africa), Apostolic Visitor in Canada of the Syro-Malankars, Apostolic Visitor in Europe of the Syro-Malankarites (July 14, 2010 – present)

Eparchs of United States of America and Canada
 Thomas Eusebius (January 4, 2016 – September 23, 2017), remains Apostolic Visitor in Europe of the Syro-Malankarites
 Philippos Stephanos (October 28, 2017 – present)

The Curia of the Eparchy

Location 
Eparchial Chancery (Aramana):
1500 De Paul Street
Elmont, NY 11003

Diocesan Statistics 
There are 16 clergy serving in the Eparchy and 17 parishes and missions.

Parishes and missions are located in 10 US states and 2 provinces of Canada.

See also 
 List of Catholic dioceses (structured view)
 List of the Catholic dioceses of the United States
 List of the Catholic bishops of the United States
 St. Jude Syro Malankara Catholic Church

References

External links 
In general
 St. Mary, Queen of Peace Syro-Malankara Catholic Eparchy of the United States of America and Canada official website
 GigaCatholic, with incumbent biography links 
 Pope Erects Exarchate For Syro-Malankara Catholics In U.S.; Names Priest From India As First Bishop (press release). July 14, 2010. U.S. Conference of Catholic Bishops website

Church News
 Syro Malankara Catholic Church News

Eastern Catholicism in New York (state)
Dioceses established in the 21st century
Eastern Catholic dioceses in Canada
Eastern Catholic dioceses in the United States
Eastern Catholicism in the United States
Indian-American culture
Indo-Canadian culture
Christian organizations established in 2010
Saint Thomas Christians
Syro-Malankara Catholic Church
2010 establishments in the United States